Scorpaenopsis furneauxi, Furneaux scorpionfish, is a species of venomous marine ray-finned fish belonging to the family Scorpaenidae, the scorpionfishes. This species is found in the Western Pacific.

Etymology
The fish is named in honor of Capt. Tobias Furneaux, an English navigator and Royal Navy officer who accompanied Captain James Cook on the second voyage of exploration, which included Australia, where this species happens to occur.

Size

References

furneauxi
Taxa named by Gilbert Percy Whitley
Fish described in 1959